Dinocolpodes emeishanicus is a species of beetle in the family Carabidae, the only species in the genus Dinocolpodes.

References

Platyninae